Pompton–Riverdale is a former railroad station in the borough of Riverdale, Morris County, New Jersey, United States. Located at 13 Pompton–Hamburg Turnpike (County Route 511 Alternate), the station was a stop on the Greenwood Lake Division of the Erie Railroad. A single side platform station with two tracks, the current station was built in 1919. The next station to the north was Pompton Junction, where connections were available to the New York, Susquehanna and Western Railroad, another Erie Railroad subsidiary. The next station south was Pompton Plains.

History 

Service at the station began on January 1, 1873 as part of the Montclair Railway, built for operations of the New York and Oswego Midland Railroad. At that time, the stop was known as Pompton. This service became a part of the New York and Greenwood Lake in December 1878, followed by the Erie Railroad in 1896. The old station depot at Pompton burned down on December 9, 1904. After the fire, the Erie Railroad turned former passenger and freight combination car no. 793 on the side of the tracks to serve as a bonafide depot for passenger service. The nearby borough of Pompton Lakes brought the Erie Railroad to a hearing of the Board of Railroad Commissioners in 1909 to complain about the state of the station. The Commissioners ordered the Erie Railroad to build a new structure at Pompton.

At the same time, there was a stop south of Pompton known as Riverdale, located just east of modern-day Route 23. By 1951, the station was a flag stop that the Erie wanted to rid itself of. Opposition was non-existent and the Board of Public Utility Commissioners allowed the Erie to eliminate the stop on July 20, 1951. The name Riverdale was moved to the Pompton station after the elimination of the Riverdale stop, changing the name to Pompton–Riverdale.

After years of declining service, the Erie merged with the Delaware, Lackawanna and Western Railroad on October 17, 1960, forming the Erie-Lackawanna Railway. On October 27, 1963, as part of the Passaic Plan, which ripped out the Erie Main Line tracks in Passaic and the Lackawanna Boonton Branch through Paterson, service at Pompton–Riverdale was reduced to a shuttle service between the Mountain View station in Wayne to Wanaque–Midvale. Service on this shuttle ended on September 30, 1966 when the Erie Lackawanna discontinued several branch lines.

Despite the ending of passenger service, freight at the station and along the line continued after 1966. In 1968, the Erie Lackawanna applied to have the station agent at Pompton–Riverdale be discontinued. The Public Utilities Commissioners held a hearing on June 11 in which the Erie Lackawanna contended that the freight revenue did not make an agent economically viable. However, the Commissioners sided with the opposition in July, forcing the Erie Lackawanna to continue the agent service. The Erie Lackawanna repeated the process in 1971. This time a hearing was held on July 15, 1971. The borough of Riverdale expressed interest in buying the depot once the Erie Lackawanna agent was discontinued. This time, the agent was discontinued and the station was abandoned. The Erie Lackawanna offered up the depot for $10 (1971 USD) to the borough of Riverdale.

See also 
Montclair-Boonton Line

Bibliography

References

External links 

Former Erie Railroad stations
Railway stations in the United States opened in 1873
Railway stations closed in 1966
Transportation in Morris County, New Jersey
Former railway stations in New Jersey
Riverdale, New Jersey
1966 disestablishments in New Jersey
1873 establishments in New Jersey